Hengoed railway station is the name of an operational National Rail station situated in Hengoed, Wales, on the Rhymney Line of the Valley Lines network.

History 
The current station was initially named Hengoed & Maesycwmmer when opened by the Rhymney Railway in 1858. Then on railway grouping into the Great Western Railway in 1923 it became known as Hengoed Low Level to avoid confusion.

Hengoed High Level railway station 
Immediately adjacent, and crossing Hengoed Low Level was another station which originally shared the name Hengoed & Maesycwmmer, serving the Taff Vale Extension from Pontypool to Quakers Yard (and ultimately ). This station was renamed in 1923 to Hengoed High Level. The High Level station was immediately at the end of the Hengoed Viaduct, which carried the line across the Rhymney valley to Maesycwmmer. It was closed in June 1964. The line is disused, but the viaduct has been restored and is now part of the National Cycle Network. Some remains of the platforms have also been preserved.

Maesycwmmer railway station 

The towns shared a third railway station on the former Rumney Railway, which on amalgamation with the Brecon and Merthyr Tydfil Junction Railway was called Maesycwmmer & Hengoed. In 1923 it was renamed simply Maesycwmmer.

Services
During the evening, the frequency drops to hourly each way and on Sundays to two-hourly (when trains run southbound to ).

References

External links

Photographs of the current station and remains of Hengoed High Level

Railway stations in Caerphilly County Borough
DfT Category F2 stations
Former Rhymney Railway stations
Railway stations in Great Britain opened in 1858
Railway stations served by Transport for Wales Rail